The men's 800 metres was an event at the 1992 Summer Olympics in Barcelona, Spain. There were a total number of 59 participating athletes from 48 nations, with eight qualifying heats. The maximum number of athletes per nation had been set at 3 since the 1930 Olympic Congress. The event was won by William Tanui of Kenya, the second straight Games in which a Kenyan man won the 800 metres.

Summary

Johnny Gray took the race out to the "Gray zone" running the first lap in 49.9 hoping to burn off the competition.  His only follower was José Luiz Barbosa with Nixon Kiprotich and William Tanui trailing a clear breakaway from the rest of the field.  Entering the final turn, Gray stumbled for a moment, losing momentum, but a straining Barbosa could not take advantage.  Through the turn, the two Kenyans Tanui and Kiprotich worked their way around Barbosa, with Tanui challenging Gray for the lead.  At first Gray was able to head off the challenge but Tanui kept coming and the depleted Gray could not hold on.  Kiprotich, only a time qualifier from his semi, closed late on his teammate, passing Gray for silver.

Background

This was the 22nd appearance of the event, which is one of 12 athletics events to have been held at every Summer Olympics. Four finalists from 1988, including the champion, returned: gold medalist Paul Ereng of Kenya, fifth-place finisher Johnny Gray of the United States (also a finalist in 1984), sixth-place finisher José Luiz Barbosa of Brazil, and eighth-place finisher Nixon Kiprotich of Kenya. The Kenyan team was strong, even without two-time world champion Billy Konchellah (out due to asthma); William Tanui joined the two veterans.

Belize, the Central African Republic, the Maldives, Mauritania, and Vanuatu all appeared in the event for the first time. Some of the former Soviet republics were represented on the Unified Team. There was one Independent Olympic Participant from Yugoslavia. Unified Yemen appeared for the first time, though North Yemen had competed previously. Great Britain made its 21st appearance, most among all nations, having had no competitors in the event only in the 1904 Games in St. Louis.

Competition format

The men's 800 metres returned to a smaller field with only three rounds, the most common format since 1912, after two Games of a four-round format. The "fastest loser" system introduced in 1964 was used for the first two rounds. There were eight first-round heats, each with 7 or 8 athletes; the top two runners in each heat as well as the next eight fastest overall advanced to the semifinals. There were three semifinals with 8 athletes each; the top two runners in each semifinal and the next two fastest overall advanced to the eight-man final.

Records

Prior to the competition, the existing World and Olympic records were as follows.

No world or Olympic records were set during the competition.

The following national records were established during the competition:

Schedule

All times are Central European Summer Time (UTC+2)

Results

Round 1

Heat 1

Heat 2

Heat 3

Heat 4

Heat 5

Heat 6

Heat 7

Heat 8

Semifinals

Semifinal 1

Semifinal 2

Semifinal 3

Final

The final was held on August 5, 1992.

Tanui's winning margin of 0.04 seconds remains the smallest winning margin in the history of the event.

See also
 1990 Men's European Championships 800 metres (Split)
 1991 Men's World Championships 800 metres (Tokyo)
 1993 Men's World Championships 800 metres (Stuttgart)
 1994 Men's European Championships 800 metres (Helsinki)

References

External links
 Official Report
 Results

 
800 metres at the Olympics
Men's events at the 1992 Summer Olympics